Viger may refer to:

People

There are a number of prominent Canadians with the surname Viger.  This includes:
 Amanda Viger (1845–1909), nun, pharmacist and hospital founder
 André Viger (1952–2006), wheelchair marathoner and Paralympic
 Bonaventure Viger (1804–1877), French-Canadian who was part of the Lower Canada Rebellion, cousin of Denis-Benjamin
 Denis Viger (1741–1805), merchant and politician
 Denis-Benjamin Viger (1774–1861), one of the Joint Premiers of the Province of Canada, son of Denis
 Jacques Viger (Member of the Assembly) (1735–1798), member of the Legislative Assembly of Lower Canada 
 Jacques Viger (1787–1858) (1787–1858), first mayor of Montreal
 Joseph Viger (1739–1803), businessman and political figure in Lower Canada
 Louis-Michel Viger (1785–1855), lawyer, politician and businessman
 Viger (Surrey cricketer), an English professional cricketer
 Viger (Graphic Designer), an Egyptian who have a solution for a lot of complications

Places

 Viger, Hautes-Pyrénées, a commune of the Hautes-Pyrénées département, in southwestern France 
 Viger (provincial electoral district), a former Quebec provincial electoral district
 Jacques Viger Building was both a grand hotel and railway station in Montreal 
 Viger Avenue, a street in Montreal 
 Viger Square, a public square in Montreal